And No Birds Sing is a Canadian drama film, released in 1969. Directed by Victor Cowie and produced by the University of Manitoba Students' Union, the film centres on a university student's attempts to win the love of a female classmate he is romantically interested in. The film's cast included Ian Malcolm, Marsha Sadoway, Michael Posner, Judy Daniels and Brian Stavechny.

The film was a Canadian Film Award nominee in 1969 for Best Film Over 30 Minutes, and Posner won the award for Best Supporting Actor in a Non-Feature.

References

External links

1969 films
Canadian drama films
Films shot in Winnipeg
Films set in Winnipeg
University of Manitoba
1969 drama films
Canadian student films
English-language Canadian films
1960s English-language films
1960s Canadian films